María Elena Salinas (born December 30, 1954), is an American broadcast journalist, news anchor, and author. Called the "Voice of Hispanic America" by The New York Times, Salinas is one of the most recognized Hispanic female journalists in the United States. She was the co-anchor of Noticiero Univision, the primary evening news broadcast on Univision, and the co-host of the news magazine program Aquí y Ahora (Here and Now).

Salinas has been working for more than three decades in the U.S. and in 18 Latin American countries. She has interviewed Latin American heads of state, rebel leaders, dictators, and every United States president since Jimmy Carter.

Journalism career

Salinas began as a reporter, anchor and public-affairs host for KMEX-TV, the Univision affiliate in Los Angeles, in 1981. She became the anchor of the national Spanish-language news program Noticiero Univision in 1987.

She has interviewed figures such as former US Presidents Bill Clinton and Barack Obama; Manuel Noriega, the former military dictator of Panama; Nicaraguan President Daniel Ortega; and the Zapatista Army of National Liberation spokesman Subcomandante Marcos. She has also interviewed celebrities such as Jennifer Lopez, Ricky Martin and Gloria Estefan.

Salinas was among the first female journalists in wartime Baghdad. She herself has been interviewed by Katie Couric Bill Moyers, and others.

Salinas participated in the bilingual national Democratic presidential candidate debate on Hispanic issues in 2004, and again in 2007 co-hosting the first Democratic and Republican presidential candidate forums in Spanish on the Univision Network.

In 2017, she began an English-language crime program The Real Story with María Elena Salinas, on Investigation Discovery. For ten years from 2001-2011, she wrote a weekly syndicated column in English and Spanish.

On Aug.3, 2017, Univision announced that Salinas would be leaving her post as co-anchor of Noticiero Univisión at the end of 2017. In a Facebook post, Salinas said she plans to become an independent news producer and that she was not pushed out.

On July 1, 2018, she participated in Telemundo's Mexican presidential elections coverage and on December 1, exactly five months later, she was part of Telemundo's news team covering the Mexican presidential inauguration from Mexico City.

On July 22, 2019, CBS News announced Maria Elena Salinas would be joining as a contributor. María Elena Salinas joined "CBS This Morning" to break down the diverse Latino communities across the U.S. that were long held as a single voting bloc, but economic, geographic and cultural differences show stark divides in how Latino Americans have cast their ballots in the 2020 United States presidential election.

In March 2022, Maria Elena Salinas became a contributor for ABC News

Public service and philanthropy

For almost twenty years Salinas has volunteered for the National Association of Latino Elected and Appointed Officials, which encourages immigrants to vote and otherwise participate in politics; she is the spokesperson for its Ya Es Hora ("It's Time") program.

Salinas is a founder of the National Association of Hispanic Journalists and was inducted into its Hall of Fame in 2006. She also sponsors the Maria Elena Salinas Scholarship for college students interested in Spanish news broadcasting.

She is on the boards of the Hispanic Scholarship Fund and the International Women's Media Foundation.

Awards and recognition
Salinas has won numerous awards and distinctions for both her journalism and philanthropic work.

Salinas won a 2014 Peabody Award, Walter Cronkite Award and Gracie Award for her news and documentary special "Entre el abandono y el rechazo" (Between Abandonment and Rejection), a prime-time report on the exodus of Central American children to the United States, which judges praised as "balanced and revealing."

In 2014, she won the Broadcast Legend Award from the Radio and Television News Association of Southern California. In 2012, with her co-anchor Jorge Ramos, she received an Emmy Award for Lifetime Achievement from the National Academy of Television Arts and Sciences. In 2013, Broadcasting & Cable and Multichannel News presented Salinas with the Award for Outstanding Achievement at the 11th Annual Hispanic Television Summit, produced by Schramm Marketing Group. Earlier in her career, Salinas was part of the Univision News team that received the Edward R. Murrow Award for the network's coverage of the Atlanta Olympic Park bombings in 1996.

For her philanthropic work, Salinas is a recipient of the Intrepid Award from the National Organization for Women, and has been honored by organizations including the Mexican American Legal Defense and Educational Fund, the National Association of Latino Elected and Appointed Officials and the Congressional Hispanic Caucus Institute, among others.

In 2017, Salinas was a commencement speaker in American University and California State University, Fullerton and received an honorary doctorate from American University. She was presented with the Leading Ladies of Entertainment accolade by the Latin Recording Academy in 2020.

Personal life
Salinas's parents immigrated to the United States from Mexico in the 1940s. She was born in Los Angeles in 1954. As a child, she lived in Mexico for 7 years. Since 1991, Salinas has lived in Miami with her 2 daughters, Julia Alexandra and Gabriela Maria.

Salinas's autobiography, Yo Soy la Hija de mi Padre (I Am my Father's Daughter, 2006) covers her discovery that her father had once been a Catholic priest.

References

External links
 
 Stories by and about Maria Elena Salinas, from Univision

1954 births
Living people
Mexican news anchors
Mexican journalists
American television personalities of Mexican descent
University of California, Los Angeles alumni
Mexican emigrants to the United States
American women television journalists